A Glock switch or Glock auto-sear is a small device that can be attached to the rear of the slide of a Glock handgun, converting the semi-automatic pistol into a machine pistol capable of full automatic fire. As a type of auto sear, it functions by applying force to the trigger bar to prevent it from limiting fire to one round of ammunition per pull. This device by itself, regardless if it is installed on a slide or not, is considered by the Bureau of Alcohol, Tobacco, Firearms and Explosives (ATF) to be a machine gun. Therefore, the possession of this device is illegal under United States federal law if the person in possession does not have the required licensing.

Operation
A Glock switch functions by applying force to a semi-automatic pistol's trigger bar to prevent it from limiting fire to one round of ammunition per pull. It thus converts the weapon into a machine pistol capable of automatic fire. The device is roughly the size of a United States quarter, and when installed on the rear of the slide on a Glock pistol (replacing the slide cover plate), adds a selective fire switch; flipping the switch sets the weapon to full automatic mode. The switch tends to reduce the accuracy of handguns, which endangers bystanders near shootings.

History

A handgun with a Glock switch attached fits the definition of an illegal machine gun under United States federal law. The 1986 Firearm Owners Protection Act made new machine guns illegal for civilians to own, banning "possession and transfer of new automatic firearms and parts that fire bullets without stopping once the trigger is depressed", with the exception of machine guns manufactured prior to May 19, 1986. Those caught with a switch-modified handgun can be prosecuted federally. The penalties for possession of an unregistered machine gun in the United States are up to a $250,000 fine and prison sentences of up to 10 years.

In 2019, the ATF recovered thousands of the devices which were imported from China. In 2021 and 2022, people have been manufacturing the switch devices with 3D printers. In March 2022, a Vice News investigation learned that the federal prosecutions which involved conversion devices have been rising since 2017. They determined that from 2017 to 2022, advances in low-cost 3D printers and global commerce on the internet have made the devices available for as little as US$20. In 2022, federal authorities documented a dramatic rise in the prevalence of the Glock switches.

See also
Hell-Fire trigger
Recoil operation
Slamfire
Gun politics in the United States

References

External links
Video More 'Glock Switches' confiscated in Tennessee
Video Penny-sized 'Glock switch' turns handgun into automatic weapon

Firearm actions
Gun politics in the United States
Firearm components